Since the beginning of Dadaism in the Cabaret Voltaire, Zurich in 1916, many artists have experimented with extreme performance art as a critique of contemporary consumer culture. Some have used bodily fluids such as blood, faeces and urine. Other times they perform self-mutilation. Simulated (artificial) blood has also been used. In the 1960s and 1970s extreme performance was elevated to a movement with the Viennese actionists. In recent times there has been a resurgence in extreme performance as a response to the increasing alienation some artists feel in the face of today's technological advances.

Artists
Some contemporary artists using extreme performance include:
 Ron Athey
 Abel Azcona
 Franko B
 Bob Flanagan
 Yang Zhichao
 Rocío Boliver
 monochrom, e.g. Eignblunzn, Buried Alive (performance)

See also
 Performance art

References

 "Some Art's Painful by Design". Newsweek.

External links
 The 8 Top Shocking Art Performances. Artiholics.

Performances